Willis Thomas Wilson Jr. (born March 22, 1960) is an American basketball coach.  He was most recently the head coach of the Texas A&M–Corpus Christi Islanders men's basketball team before retiring in March 2021. He previously served an assistant coach for the Memphis Tigers men's basketball team. Wilson was head men's basketball coach of at Rice University for 16 seasons, from 1992 to 2008.

A former basketball letterwinner and 1982 graduate from Rice, Wilson served as an assistant at Rice in the 1980s and as an assistant at Stanford University in 1991.  He became head coach at Rice in 1992.  During his 16 years as head coach at Rice, Wilson became winningest coach in Rice basketball history.  After a 3–27 record in 2007–08, Rice athletic director Chris Del Conte announced on March 14, 2008 that Wilson would not be retained for the next season.

On April 17, 2009, Wilson was hired by Memphis head coach Josh Pastner as an assistant.

Head coaching record

College

References

External links
 Texas A&M–Corpus Christi profile
 Rice profile
 

1960 births
Living people
American men's basketball coaches
American men's basketball players
Basketball coaches from Indiana
Basketball players from Indianapolis
College men's basketball head coaches in the United States
High school basketball coaches in the United States
Rice Owls men's basketball coaches
Rice Owls men's basketball players
Stanford Cardinal men's basketball coaches
Texas A&M–Corpus Christi Islanders men's basketball coaches